Don Quixote is a 2010 Chinese and Hong Kong film directed by Ah Gan based on Miguel de Cervantes' 17th-century novel. It was promoted as China's first fully 3-D film.

Cast
 Guo Tao as Tang Fanghai (Don Quixote)
 Wang Gang as Sang Qiu (Sancho Panza)
 Karena Lam as Sang Cuihua (Dulcinea)
 Miao Pu as Jin Xiang Tong
 Liu Hua as Linghu
 Paul Chun as Dongfang
 Hai Yi Tian as Ximen
 Ying Zhuang as Sima Wan, the Taoist

Production
Director Ah Gan stated that nearly 60 percent of the film is made up of special effects. To create these special effect shots, he tried several special effects companies before taking his film to England, where he used the equipment and technology from the hit film Ice Age. The film was promoted as China's first wholly 3-D movie as only the action sequences in Yuen Woo-ping's True Legend (2010) were shot in 3-D.

Release
Don Quixote was released on October 15, 2010 in China. In its opening week, the film grossed a total of $1,809,682 and was the third highest film in the Chinese box office. The film grossed a total of $5,115,844 in China. The film was released on October 28 in Hong Kong where it grossed a total of $16,246.

Reception
Film Business Asia gave the film a five out of ten rating, calling it a stating that "after about half-an-hour — around the time the film leaves behind the novel and embarks on its own invented story — it becomes clear that it isn't developing any dramatic momentum of its own."

Notes

2010 films
2010 3D films
Chinese 3D films
Films based on Don Quixote
Hong Kong 3D films